Marc Rosset defended his title, defeating Arnaud Boetsch 7–6(8–6), 7–6(7–4).

Seeds

Draws

Finals

Section 1

Section 2

External links
 ATP main draw

Singles